José Antonio Fernández (born 26 January 1965) is a Chilean former professional tennis player. 

Fernández is the son of Carmen Ibarra and nephew of Patricio Cornejo, both noted international tennis players.

A 1979 Orange Bowl champion (in the 14s), Fernández turned professional the following year and competed through the 1980s and into the early 1990s. He had a career high singles ranking of 202 in the world and featured in qualifiers at the 1981 Wimbledon Championships. At his peak he competed regularly on the ATP Challenger Tour, with a final appearance at Salerno in 1989, but he also made four main draw appearances on the ATP Tour/Grand Prix circuits.

Fernández represented Chile in six Davis Cup ties between 1985 and 1991, finishing with a 7/4 singles record.

Previously based in Germany for many years, Fernández had worked as a tennis coach since retiring and had involvement in coaching Steffi Graf. He is now living in Florida, where he runs a high performance sports coaching company called SPORTmind INC.

See also
List of Chile Davis Cup team representatives

References

External links
 
 
 

1965 births
Living people
Chilean male tennis players